Mort Glickman (December 6, 1898 – February 27, 1953) was an American composer of film scores.  He spent most of his career writing scores (often uncredited) for Republic Pictures, where he contributed to more than 175 films.

Selected filmography
 Rookies on Parade (1941)
 Mercy Island (1941)
 Joan of Ozark (1942)
 The Girl from Alaska (1942)
 Days of Old Cheyenne (1943)
 Black Hills Express (1943)
 The Purple V (1943)
 San Fernando Valley (1944)
 Don't Fence Me In (1945)
 The Man from Oklahoma (1945)
 Along the Navajo Trail (1945)
 The Mysterious Mr. Valentine (1946)
 Stagecoach to Denver (1946)
 The Pilgrim Lady (1947)
 King of the Gamblers (1948)
 The Longhorn (1951)
 Rose of Cimarron (1952)
 Invaders from Mars (1953)

References

Bibliography
 William C. Cline. In the Nick of Time: Motion Picture Sound Serials. McFarland, 1997.

External links

1898 births
1953 deaths
20th-century American composers
American film score composers
American Jews
American male film score composers
Jewish American film score composers